Air Algérie/Phoenix Flight 702P, named Oasis and registered 7T-VEE, was a Boeing 737 owned by Air Algérie and leased by Phoenix Aviation. On 21 December, 1994, in low visibility conditions, it collided with power transmission cables and a pylon during its final approach to Coventry Airport in the United Kingdom. The aircraft was overturned and damaged several houses before crashing inverted into a wooded area beyond. All five persons on board were killed.

History

On the day of the accident, the aircraft and crew departed Amsterdam for their second flight to Coventry that morning (their first having arrived at 0340 hrs), where live animals were to be loaded on board for export to the Netherlands and France. The aircraft was not equipped to receive the newer Instrument landing system signal for the runway in use, so the pilots used a Surveillance radar approach (SRA) procedure, which depended on guidance from an air traffic control radar operator. The aircrew was experienced with SRA approach procedures at Coventry, having conducted an SRA approach earlier that day to the same runway, "showing close adherence to the ideal approach path." Visibility was too poor to make a safe landing on this second approach, so the captain performed a missed approach procedure and diverted to the East Midlands Airport.

The flight departed East Midlands at 9:38 local time in order to make another attempt to land at the scheduled destination. At this point the pilots had been on duty for ten hours total (two hours more than their company's normal maximum for overnight operations), including five flight segments since 2345 hrs the previous night, two of which had included SRA approaches to runway 23 at Coventry (one concluding with a successful landing at 0340 hrs and the second concluding with a missed approach and diversion to East Midlands at 0740 hrs, and both being described as accurate and correctly stabilised by AAIB investigators). The accident flight lasted fourteen minutes, which left the crew with insufficient time to perform all normal flight deck procedures. During their third  and final SRA approach to runway 23 at Coventry, their approach was never stabilised, and they developed an excess of airspeed. The landing checklist was not completed, and there was minimal communication between the captain and the first officer. The latter did not call out the minimum descent altitude (MDA), which is normal company procedure. The collision severed the upper portion of the tower and caused severe damage to the left engine and to the structure of the left wing; the aircraft rolled to the left and dropped, damaging several houses in Sunbury before crashing into Willenhall, Coventry woodland and catching fire.

Aftermath

The Air Accidents Investigation Branch (AAIB) determined that the accident was caused by the flight crew allowing the aircraft to descend significantly below the minimum descent height for the approach without gaining sight of the approach lighting or runway threshold. The AAIB also found that the crew had failed to cross-check altimeter height indications during the approach, that the non-handling pilot failed to call out the minimum descent height as the aircraft reached that altitude, and that the flight crew's performance had been impaired by the effects of fatigue.

A brass plaque remembering the event is now located in Middle Ride, close to the crash scene, which was erected on the 10th anniversary of the accident by the Willenhall Wood Residents Association.

See also
 List of accidents and incidents involving commercial aircraft

References

Bibliography
Air Accidents Investigation Branch
"Report on the accident to Boeing 737-2D6C, 7T-VEE at Willenhall, Coventry, Warwickshire on 21 December 1994." (Archive)
Appendices to the report (Archive)
"SUMMARY AAR 1/1996: Boeing 737, 7T-VEE." (Archive)

External links
 

Airliner accidents and incidents caused by pilot error
Accidents and incidents involving the Boeing 737 Original
Aviation accidents and incidents in 1994
Aviation accidents and incidents in England
History of Coventry
Air Algérie accidents and incidents
Phoenix Aviation accidents and incidents
Disasters in Warwickshire
Disasters in the West Midlands (county)
Transport in Coventry
1994 disasters in the United Kingdom
1994 in England
December 1994 events in the United Kingdom
Airliner accidents and incidents in the United Kingdom
20th century in Coventry
Birmingham